Seeniththamby Yogeswaran (born 26 April 1970) is a Sri Lankan Tamil politician and Member of Parliament.

Early life
Yogeswaran was born on 26 April 1970.

Career
Yogeswaran was one of the Tamil National Alliance's candidates for Batticaloa District at the 2010 parliamentary election. He was elected and entered Parliament. He was re-elected at the 2015 parliamentary election.

Electoral history

References

1970 births
Illankai Tamil Arasu Kachchi politicians
Living people
Members of the 14th Parliament of Sri Lanka
Members of the 15th Parliament of Sri Lanka
People from Eastern Province, Sri Lanka
Sri Lankan Hindus
Sri Lankan Tamil politicians
Tamil National Alliance politicians